The 1908 Challenge Cup was the 12th staging of rugby league's oldest knockout competition, the Challenge Cup. Run by the Northern Rugby Football Union, 32 teams took part between 29 February and 25 April 1908. Hunslet won the competition after defeating Hull F.C. in the final.

Calendar
The 32 team knockout tournament was held over five rounds.

First round

Second round

Quarterfinals

Semifinals

Final
The final was contested by Hunslet and Hull F.C. at Fartown in Huddersfield.

The final was played on Saturday 25 April 1908, where Hunslet beat Hull F.C. 14-0 at Fartown in front of a crowd of 18,000.

Hull's 14-0 in the final to win their first Cup in their first final.

Teams:

Hunslet: Herbert Place, Fred Farrar, Billy Eagers, Walter Goldthorpe, Billy Batten, Albert Goldthorpe, Fred Smith, Harry Wilson, Bill Brookes, Bill Jukes, John "Jack" Randall, John Higson, Tom Walsh

Hull: Harry Taylor, L. Parry, G. T. Cottrell, F. J. Cook, (E. or Ned) Rogers, Harry Wallace, Billie Anderson, Tom Herridge, J. Owen, W. J. Carroll, G. Kilburn, H. Fulton, William Holder

References

External links
Challenge Cup official website 

Challenge Cup
Challenge Cup